Eustace John Hewitt Hart (14 November 1907 – 4 February 1972) played first-class cricket for Somerset in three matches in the 1930 season. He was born at Pune, India, and died at Swainswick, Bath, Somerset.

Hart played as a right-handed lower middle order batsman in his three games for Somerset at the start of the 1930 season. In his first innings, in the match against Warwickshire at Edgbaston he was second highest scorer with 16 out of a total of just 89. But this proved to be the highest score of his career and after two further games, he dropped out of the team and did not play first-class cricket again.

By profession, he was a chartered accountant and was a partner for a firm in Bristol; he played club cricket for Bath Cricket Club.

References

1907 births
1972 deaths
English cricketers
Somerset cricketers
British people in colonial India